Tetramethylammonium hydroxide (TMAH or TMAOH) is a quaternary ammonium salt with molecular formula N(CH3)4+ OH−. It is commonly encountered in form of concentrated solutions in water or methanol. TMAH in solid state and its aqueous solutions are all colorless, but may be yellowish if impure. Although TMAH has virtually no odor when pure, samples often have a strong fishy smell due to presence of trimethylamine which is a common impurity. TMAH has several diverse industrial and research applications.

Chemical properties

Structure

TMAH is most commonly encountered as an aqueous solution, in concentrations from ~2–25%, and less frequently as solutions in methanol. These solutions are identified by CAS number 75-59-2.  Several hydrates such as N(CH3)4OH·xH2O. have been crystallized.  These salts contain well separated Me4N+ cations and hydroxide anions (Me is an abbreviation of methyl group). The hydroxide groups are linked by hydrogen bonds to the water of crystallization. Anhydrous TMAH has not been isolated.

Preparation
One of the earliest preparations is that of Walker and Johnston, who made it by the salt metathesis reaction of tetramethylammonium chloride and potassium hydroxide in dry methanol, in which TMAH is soluble, but potassium chloride is not:

NMe4+Cl− + KOH → NMe4+ + KCl
Where Me stands for the methyl group, –CH3.

This report also provides details for isolation of TMAH as its pentahydrate, noting the existence of a trihydrate, and emphasizes the avidity which even the former exhibits for atmospheric moisture and carbon dioxide. These authors reported a melting point of 62–63 °C for the pentahydrate, and solubility in water measured averagely around 220 g/100 mL at 15 °C.

Reactions
TMAH is rugged. Its half-life in 6 M NaOH at 160 °C is > 61 h.

TMAH undergoes simple acid-base reactions to produce tetramethylammonium (TMA) salts whose anion is derived from said acid. Illustrative is the preparation of tetramethylammonium fluoride:  
NMe4+ + HF → NMe4+F− + H2O

Solutions of TMAH may be used to make other tetramethylammonium salts in metathesis reactions with ammonium (NH4+) salts. For example, tetramethylammonium thiocyanate may be prepared from ammonium thiocyanate as follows:
NMe4+ + NH4+SCN− → NMe4+SCN− + NH3 + H2O

TMAH and many other TMA salts containing simple anions thermally decompose into trimethylamine.  Dimethyl ether is a major decomposition product rather than methanol. The idealized equation is:

2 NMe4+ →  2 NMe3 + MeOMe  + H2O

Properties
TMAH is a very strong base.

Uses
One of the industrial uses of TMAH is for the anisotropic etching of silicon. It is used as a basic solvent in the development of acidic photoresists in the photolithography process, and is highly effective in stripping photoresists. TMAH has some phase transfer catalyst properties. It is also used as a surfactant in the synthesis of ferrofluids and to inhibit nanoparticle aggregation.

TMAH is one of the most common reagents used in thermochemolysis, an analytical technique involving both pyrolysis and chemical derivatization of analytes.

Wet anisotropic etching 
TMAH belongs to the family of quaternary ammonium hydroxide (QAH) solutions and is commonly used to anisotropically etch silicon. TMAH is advantageous over sodium or potassium hydroxide in applications that are sensitive to metal ion contamination. Typical etching temperatures are between 70 and 90 °C and typical concentrations are 5–25 wt.% TMAH in water. In case of (100) silicon etching rates generally increase with temperature and increasing TMAH concentration. Etched (100) silicon surface roughness decreases with increasing TMAH concentration, and smooth surfaces can be obtained with 20% TMAH solutions. Etch rates are typically in the 0.1–1 micrometer per minute range.

Common masking materials for long etches in TMAH include silicon dioxide (LPCVD and thermal) and silicon nitride. Silicon nitride has a negligible etch rate in TMAH. The etch rate for silicon dioxide in TMAH varies with the quality of the film, but is generally on the order of 0.1 nm/minute.

Toxicology

The tetramethylammonium ion  affects nerves and muscles, causing difficulties in breathing, muscular paralysis and possibly death. It is structurally related to acetylcholine, an important neurotransmitter at both the neuromuscular junction and autonomic ganglia. When it acts as an agonist, this structural similarity is reflected in its mechanism of toxicity – it binds to and activates the nicotinic acetylcholine receptors, although they may become desensitized in continued presence of the agonist. The action of tetramethylammonium is most pronounced in autonomic ganglia, and so tetramethylammonium is traditionally classified as a ganglion-stimulant drug.

The ganglionic effects may have contributed to deaths following accidental industrial exposure.  "Chemical burns" induced by this strong base are also severe. There is evidence that poisoning can occur through skin-contact with concentrated solutions of TMAH.

See also
 Quaternary ammonium cation
 Tetramethylammonium chloride
 Tetramethylammonium

References

Tetramethylammonium salts
Cationic surfactants
Hydroxides